Trần Thị Dung, better known by her stage name as Juky San (born 14 January 1998), is a Vietnamese singer.

Best known as the contestant of The Voice of Vietnam in 2019, she has released several well-known singles such as Yêu rồi đấy (I Love It, 2019), Phải chăng em đã yêu? (Did I Fall in Love?, 2021), and Khóc cười (Laughing Cry, 2022). In 2022, she released her first EP, Symphonies: Juky San No.22, with her lead single Mùa thu cho em (Autumn for Me).

San also participated in season 1 of The Masked Singer Vietnam with her character as ChipChip Pink, and eventually she was being eliminated in the first round.

References

External links 
Juky San in Facebook
Juky San in Instagram
Official Youtube

Living people
1998 births
People from Ho Chi Minh City
People from Thái Bình province
People from Lâm Đồng Province
Vietnamese pop singers
21st-century Vietnamese women singers